The Ultimate 20 is an American trailerable sailboat that was designed by Jim Antrim and Jeff Canepa as a one design racer and first built in 1994.

The design was named Sailing World's 1995 Boat of the Year in the PHRF/Sportboat category.

Production
The design was built in the United States starting in 1994 in California by Moore Sailboats, which built the first 35 boats. Santa Cruz Yachts then built about 20 more, before production was assumed by Ultimate Sailboats until it went bankrupt. The class association then bought the molds and had the design built by Abbott Boats in Canada. After Abbott's plant was destroyed by fire in 2006, production was passed to Columbia Yachts, but few boats were completed. It was last constructed by W. D. Schock Corp, starting in the 2010s, but it is now out of production.

Design
The boat was conceived by Hobie Cat champion sailor Jeff Canepa in the late 1980s. He was interested in the work done by Doug Hemphill, the designer of the Hotfoot 20 and Hotfoot 27 sailboats and especially his desire to add a bowsprit and asymmetrical spinnaker to the Hotfoot 20. Canepa ended up buying the Hotfoot 20 molds at a sheriff's auction. In 1993 he formed Ultimate Sailboats and started to work on an evolved design. Ron Moore of Moore Sailboats built a prototype from the Hotfoot molds and it was taken on a racing tour by John McWaid, where he gathered feedback. Next naval architect Jim Antrim was enlisted to do an overhaul of the original Hotfoot 20 design. The boat was lengthened and the freeboard, mast height and beam increased. Swept spreaders and a jib roller furler were incorporated, the sail area increased, along with a redesigned keel. The coach house and deck were also redesigned.

The Ultimate 20 is a racing keelboat, built predominantly of vinylester and polyester fiberglass with a  core of Baltek balsa. It has a fractional sloop rig with a deck-mounted retractable bowsprit, a raked stem, an open reverse transom,  a transom-hung rudder controlled by a tiller and a lifting keel with a weighted bulb. The rudder is made from carbon fiber and fiberglass, with wooden reinforcement. The keel keel is raised and lowered by a winch. It displaces  and carries  of ballast.

The boat is normally fitted with a small outboard motor for docking and maneuvering.

The design has sleeping accommodation for four people, with a double "V"-berth in the bow cabin and a two straight settees in the main cabin.

For sailing downwind the design may be equipped with an asymmetrical spinnaker flown from the bowsprit.

Operational history
The boat is supported by an active class club that organizes racing events, the U20 Class Association.

In a 1995 review for Practical Sailor, Darrell Nicholson wrote, "the boat is fairly forgiving but you have to think fast. While attempting to see how close we could sail to the wind, we nearly broached. Canepa yelled, 'We’re going over,' eased the sheet as we rounded up, then trimmed the chute as it filled on a downwind course. Total time to crash, burn, and recover was less than 15 seconds. The key to jibing, we learned, is the release of large amounts of sheet before the main comes across; this way the chute fills in front of the headstay before being blanketed by the main."

In a 2013 Sailing World review Dave Reed wrote, "the Ultimate 20's fans say it was cool way before sportboats were hip, and that even today, as the Jim Antrim design approaches its second decade, it offers one thing flashier new boats don't have: simplicity."

See also
List of sailing boat types

Similar sailboats
J/22
Melges 20
Viper 640

References

External links

Ultimate Sailboats official website archive on archive.org

Keelboats
1990s sailboat type designs
Sailing yachts
Trailer sailers
One-design sailing classes
Former classes of World Sailing
Sailboat type designs by Jim Antrim
Sailboat type designs by Jeff Canepa
Sailboat types built by Abbott Boats
Sailboat types built by Columbia Yachts
Sailboat types built by Moore Sailboats
Sailboat types built by Santa Cruz Yachts
Sailboat types built by Ultimate Sailboats
Sailboat types built by W. D. Schock Corp